Sanderson House is a historic home located near Pollocksville, Jones County, North Carolina. It was built about 1798, and is a small, -story, five bay, frame dwelling.  It rests on a high brick foundation, is sheathed in beaded weatherboards, and has a gable roof.  It features an unusual chimney that starts as two chimneys and join between the first and second levels and rise in a single stack.

It was listed on the National Register of Historic Places in 1971.

References

Houses on the National Register of Historic Places in North Carolina
Houses completed in 1798
Houses in Jones County, North Carolina
National Register of Historic Places in Jones County, North Carolina